The genus Exochaenium (22 species) is endemic to sub-Saharan Africa, with species occurring in most tropical and sub-tropical regions of the continent, particularly on the Katanga plateau (Angola, Democratic Republic of Congo and Zambia), with many extending to the Sudano-Zambesian and Guineo-Congolian regions. The genus is monophyletic and is used to study the variation and evolution of herkogamy.

Species
 Exochaenium alatum (Paiva and Nogueira) Kissling
 Exochaenium baumianum (Gilg) Schinz
 Exochaenium caudatum (Paiva and Nogueira) Kissling
 Exochaenium clavatum (Paiva and Nogueira) Kissling
 Exochaenium debile Welw.
 Exochaenium dimidiatum (Sileshi) Kissling
 Exochaenium exiguum A.W.Hill
 Exochaenium fernandesianum (Paiva and Nogueira) Kissling
 Exochaenium gracile (Welw.) Schinz
 Exochaenium grande (E.Mey.) Griseb.
 Exochaenium hockii (De Wild.) Kissling
 Exochaenium lineariforme (Sileshi) Kissling
 Exochaenium macropterum (Sileshi) Kissling
 Exochaenium oliganthum (Gilg) Kissling
 Exochaenium perparvum (Sileshi) Kissling
 Exochaenium platypterum (Baker) Schinz
 Exochaenium primulaeflorum Welw.
 Exochaenium pumilum (Baker) Hill
 Exochaenium pygmaeum Milne-Redhead
 Exochaenium rotundifolium (Peter) Kissling
 Exochaenium teucszii (Schinz) Schinz
 Exochaenium wildemanianum (Boutique) Kissling

References

Gentianaceae genera
Gentianaceae